Raja Ram Shastri (also Rajaram Shastri)  (4 June 1904 - 21 August 1991) was an Indian educationist who was elected in the 1971 Indian general election as a Member of Parliament (MP) from Varanasi during the 5th Lok Sabha, the lower house of the Parliament of India. He was a professor and subsequently Vice-Chancellor of the Kashi Vidyapeeth from 1964 - 1971.
He was the grand son of Rai Bahadur Thakur Jaiswal.

He served as a member of first National Commission on Labour and received Padma Vibhushan in 1991, the second highest civilian honor of India.

He died in New Delhi on 21 August 1991, aged 87.

References

Recipients of the Padma Vibhushan in literature & education
20th-century Indian educational theorists
1904 births
1991 deaths
India MPs 1971–1977
Lok Sabha members from Uttar Pradesh
Politicians from Varanasi
India MPs 1952–1957
Politicians from Kanpur
Indian National Congress politicians from Uttar Pradesh